The Man of Courage is a 1922 American silent Western film directed by E.K. Lincoln and starring Lincoln, Spottiswoode Aitken and Frederick Vroom.

Cast
 E.K. Lincoln as William Gregory
 Spottiswoode Aitken as Stephen Gregory
 Frederick Vroom as Morgan Deane 
 Millicent Fisher as Dorothy Deane
 Helen Dunbar as Mrs Deane
 John Eberts as Johnny Rivers
 James Young Deer as Aquila
 George Gebhardt as El Cholo

References

Bibliography
 Laura I. Serna. "We're Going Yankee": American Movies, Mexican Nationalism, and Transnational Cinema, 1917-1935. Harvard University, 2006.

External links
 

1922 films
1922 Western (genre) films
American black-and-white films
Silent American Western (genre) films
1920s English-language films
1920s American films